The Braga Town Hall (in Portuguese Paços do Concelho de Braga) is a landmark building located in Sé parish in the heart of Braga, Portugal. In there is located the headquarters of the Câmara Municipal, the city local government.

It is a work of the architect André Soares.

The Town Hall,  started in 1754, was completed in 1865.

External link

Town Hall
Government buildings completed in 1865
City and town halls in Portugal